Guglielmi is an Italian surname that may refer to
Alejandro Guglielmi (born 1936), Argentine equestrian
Alighiero Guglielmi (1912−1988), Italian racewalker
Éric Guglielmi (1970–2021), French photographer, editor, and photojournalist
Gary Guglielmi (born 1958), Australian speedway hider
Gregorio Guglielmi (1714−1773), Italian-born fresco painter who worked primarily in Germany
Louis Guglielmi (1916–1991), Spanish-born French musician 
Marco Guglielmi (1926–2005), Italian actor, screenwriter and author
Massimo Guglielmi (born 1970), Italian lightweight rower
Monica Guglielmi (born 1974), Italian former professional tennis player
Noel Gugliemi, American actor
O. Louis Guglielmi (1906–1956), American artist

Pietro Carlo Guglielmi (1772–1817), Italian opera composer
Ralph Guglielmi (1933–2017), American football quarterback
Simon Guglielmi (born 1997), French cyclist
Rodolfo Alfonso Raffaello Piero Filiberto Guglielmi (1895–1926), known as Rudolph Valentino, Italian actor based in the US 

Italian-language surnames
Patronymic surnames
Surnames from given names